The HTC ThunderBolt (ADR6400L) was the first 4G LTE smartphone on the Verizon Wireless network. It is a CDMA/LTE variant of the HTC Desire HD. It was first announced at CES on January 6, 2011.

In addition to 4G service, the ThunderBolt is the first Verizon phone to support simultaneous voice/data over 3G without the help of Wi-Fi.

Launch 
The phone was launched January 17, 2011. Best Buy was the first retailer to offer a pre-order on February 6, 2011. Wirefly and Amazon both allowed pre-orders a few days before the device was officially launched.  This launch date, however, was much later than anticipated by consumers, frustrating many potential buyers.

There was so much pent-up demand for the ThunderBolt that it broke pre-sale records for at least one online vendor.

However, despite early demand for the phone, HTC has appeared to struggle in their attempts to address multiple complaints about the device.  Some features were removed just prior to release, such as a built-in Skype app with video calling capability.  Common reported issues include complaints of short battery life, frequent rebooting, and a much delayed and troubled rollout of an update to the Android Gingerbread platform.

Hardware
The ThunderBolt has a second generation 1GHz Snapdragon processor manufactured by Qualcomm, and runs on Verizon's 4G LTE Network. It has a 4.3-inch class (480×800) WVGA TFT capacitive touchscreen covered by Gorilla Glass, a special crack and scratch resistant material made by Corning. Two cameras are included; an 8-megapixel rear-facing camera, able to record 720p video, with a dual-LED flash, and a 1.3-megapixel front-facing camera. The phone has 768 MB of RAM and 8 GB of eMMC of internal flash memory data storage ( available to user apps & user app data). An external microSDHC card slot supports up to 32 GB more storage memory, which comes preinstalled. The ThunderBolt also comes with a kickstand that works in landscape and portrait positions for photo or video viewing. A LED notification light is located near the earpiece.

Software
The ThunderBolt shipped with Android 2.2 (Froyo) and it was later updated in September 2011 to Android 2.3 (Gingerbread).  In early February 2013, the ThunderBolt was updated to Android 4.0.4 (Ice Cream Sandwich) and Sense 3.6.

The 4.0.4 update brought many new features to the Thunderbolt, including new camera filters and features, the ability to capture screenshots, and facial recognition to unlock the device. It also improved the device's stability and improved connectivity issues. Connectivity issues were the reason why HTC and Verizon Wireless did not immediately release the 4.0.4 update. The "Fit the puzzle piece" unlock screen prompt was replaced by “Drag down to unlock.”

Another new feature with the 4.0.4 update was the built-in data manager. This feature helps users manage and view their recent data usage. This feature would show a graph of data usage for the time period that the user had previously set. The feature would also keep track of the user's data usage, and would alert the user when they were close to their data limit, which the user would have previously set.

See also
 Android (operating system)
 HTC Desire HD
 HTC Inspire 4G

References

External links

Android (operating system) devices
Verizon Wireless
ThunderBolt
Mobile phones introduced in 2011
Discontinued smartphones
Mobile phones with user-replaceable battery